The Cohutta Wilderness was designated in 1975, expanded in 1986, and currently consists of . The Wilderness is managed by the United States Forest Service in Tennessee and is part of the National Wilderness Preservation System.

The Cohutta Wilderness is the largest wilderness in Georgia. With more than 60,000 visitors each year, it is also the largest, most heavily used wilderness in the Southern Appalachians.  In May, 2006, the Forest Service announced new limits on the use of the Wilderness, explaining:"Overuse from visitors is causing resource impacts that are threatening the very qualities that made this area worthy of wilderness designation. Changes in the management of the Cohutta are necessary to reverse this trend to preserve the wilderness environment and provide future generations with the enjoyment of a true wilderness experience".Among the new regulations will be limits on the number of people allowed in a single group and on the use of camp fires.

The Benton MacKaye Trail traverses the Wilderness. The Cohutta Wilderness borders the Big Frog Wilderness which is also located in Georgia and Tennessee. The name Cohutta is derived from the Cherokee word cohutta, which means "frog" or could mean "a shed roof supported on poles".

Rough Ridge fire

The Rough Ridge wildfire began on October 16, 2016 with a lightning strike. Due to drought conditions the wildfire rapidly expanded to 27,870 acres.  The fire management objectives were to allow the fire to burn naturally and provide for firefighter and public safety.

See also
 List of U.S. Wilderness Areas
 Cohutta Mountains
 Wilderness Act

References

External links 

 Wilderness.net entry for the Cohutta Wilderness
 Sherpa Guides entry for the Cohutta Wilderness
 Consauga River Alliance - Cohutta Wilderness

Wilderness areas of the Appalachians
Protected areas of Fannin County, Georgia
Protected areas of Gilmer County, Georgia
Protected areas of Murray County, Georgia
Protected areas of Polk County, Tennessee
Wilderness areas of Georgia (U.S. state)
Wilderness areas of Tennessee
Protected areas established in 1975
Chattahoochee-Oconee National Forest
Cherokee National Forest
1975 establishments in Georgia (U.S. state)
1975 establishments in Tennessee